A90 or A-90 may refer to:

 A-90 Orlyonok, a Soviet model of Ekranoplan
 A90 road, a road connecting Edinburgh and Fraserburgh (both in Scotland)
 A90 TRACON, an FAA Air Traffic Control facility in Merrimack, NH
 Austin A90 motor car, either the Austin Atlantic or Austin Westminster
 Autostrada A90, the orbital motorway that encircles Rome
 Dutch Defence, in the Encyclopaedia of Chess Openings
 Hanlin eReader A90, an ebook reader
 Samsung Galaxy A90 5G, smartphone released in 2019
 Toyota Supra ( A90 ), a sport car from Japanese Automaker, Toyota